The Hyundai Ioniq 6 is a battery electric mid-size fastback sedan produced by Hyundai Motor Company. It is the second vehicle marketed under the electric car-focused Ioniq sub-brand, and the fourth model developed on the Hyundai Electric Global Modular Platform (E-GMP).

Overview 
The Ioniq 6 was launched on 12 July 2022. It will be produced at the Asan plant in South Korea, which also produces the Sonata and Grandeur, starting in the third quarter of 2022. Pre-orders started in July 2022. Deliveries are scheduled to commence in Korea and selected European markets in late 2022. For the United States market, production is scheduled to start in January 2023 and sales will start in March of that year.

On 14 July 2022, the Ioniq 6 was unveiled at the 2022 Busan International Motor Show in South Korea. EV performance tuning technology, electric vehicle virtual driving sound, and electric vehicle active sound design were applied. The scope of application of OTA software update technology has been extended to suspension, brakes, and airbags. In addition, driving assistance technologies such as navigation-based smart cruise control, highway driving assistance, and remote smart parking assistance have been added.

In November 2022, IONIQ 6 achieved the highest overall rating in the New Car Assessment Programme, including adult occupant protection, child occupant protection, pedestrian protection, and safety assistance systems.

Design development

The Ioniq 6 was developed under the codename CE. It was previewed by the Prophecy concept car which was showcased in March 2020.

A design sketch was released first as a teaser image on 21 June 2022. The concept sketch of the car represented the "Electrified Streamliner" design approach, built on Hyundai's new E-GMP platform; the sketch showed a soft streamlined design that minimizes wind resistance. A long wheelbase was applied compared to the overall height.

A series of photos showing details were released in the days leading up to 29 June 2022, when an overall photograph of the Ioniq 6 was unveiled.

Similar to the Ioniq 5, the "Parametric Pixel" design is applied to the front lights. In addition, the Ioniq 6 is the first vehicle to use Hyundai's new stylized-H emblem, which was manufactured in the form of a thin plane made of aluminium. The side profile incorporates a streamlined window line, a built-in flush door handle, and optional side-mounted Digital Side Mirror (DSM) replacing conventional side mirrors. Attention to these and other aerodynamic details such as rear spoilers, external active air flaps, and wheel air curtains were credited for lowering the coefficient of drag to 0.21. The rear of the vehicle combines the rear spoiler with parametric pixel auxiliary braking light.

Hyundai Executive Vice President SangYup Lee, who leads the Hyundai Design Centre, described the interior as "a mindful cocoon that offers personalized place for all". The extended interior space is created by the vehicle's long wheelbase. The vehicle function operation unit was designed to be centralized and the storage space was expanded by applying a bridge-type centre console. In addition, eco-friendly materials were applied to interior and exterior painting, sheets, dashboards, and headliners.

RN22e 
The RN22e concept is derived from the Ioniq 6 and carries the Hyundai N motorsport sub-brand; it also was revealed in July 2022. The RN22e previews an Ioniq 6 N high-performance variant for regular production; it is equipped with an all-wheel drive powertrain featuring upgraded traction motors that have outputs of  front and rear, respectively, and electronic torque vectoring on the rear differential using a twin-clutch system, branded e-TVTC. The motors now rotate at up to 20,000 RPM, compared to 15,000 RPM in the regular Ioniq 6, increasing top speed. Power is supplied by a 77.4 kW-hr battery.

Compared to the regular Ioniq 6, the RN22e is  longer and  wider, rolling on 21-inch wheels. The cooling system has been upgraded to prevent overheating of the battery and motors. It is equipped with an optional "gearshift mode" which simulates engine noises and a paddle-shifted transmission implemented by briefly decreasing motor output, which was called "surprisingly convincing" but slowed the car's overall lap time.

The RN22e is being used to test components that will be fitted to the racing variant of the Ioniq 6, with which Hyundai N plan to campaign in the eTouring Car World Cup series starting in 2023. The forthcoming Ioniq 6-based racing car will replace the Veloster N ETCR that was raced in 2021 and 2022. During a hands-on session at the Bilster Berg track, Motor Trend writer Angus MacKenzie noted "the RN22e was setup deliberately to be something of a show-off drift king, to prove an EV can make you smile behind the wheel".

Specifications 

Notes

Using an 800 V DC charger supplying 350 kW, the battery can be charged from 10% to 80% in less than 18 minutes. The Standard Model is not planned to be marketed in the United States.

References

External links 

 

6
Cars introduced in 2022
Mid-size cars
Sedans
Euro NCAP large family cars
Production electric cars